AEK Athens B Football Club (Αθλητική Ένωσις Κωνσταντινουπόλεως; Athlitikí Énosis Konstadinoupόleos, meaning Athletic Union of Constantinople) is a Greek professional football club based in Nea Filadelfeia, a suburb of Athens, Greece.

Founded in 2021, it is the reserve team of AEK Athens, and currently plays in Super League Greece 2, holding its home matches at the Spata Training Centre.

Reserve teams in Greece play in the same league system as the senior team, rather than in a reserve team league. They must play at least one level below their main side, and thus AEK Athens B are ineligible for promotion to Super League Greece. They also cannot play in the Greek Cup.

History
Founded in 2021, AEK Athens B Football Club became AEK Athens' reserve team and began to play home games at Spata Training Centre.

Stadium
The Spata Training Centre, was built in 2010, it is located in the suburban Athens area of Spata and ever since then it is the home ground for all of the football club's departments.

Players

Current squad

Personnel

Current staff

|}

See also
:Category:AEK Athens F.C. B players

References

External links
AEK Athens Academies

 
Football
Football clubs in Athens
Association football clubs established in 2021
2021 establishments in Greece
Greek B teams
Super League Greece 2 clubs